Mary Gray may refer to:
 Mary W. Gray (born 1938), American mathematician
 Mary Tenney Gray (1833–1904), American editorial writer, philanthropist, and suffragette 
 Bessy Bell and Mary Gray, ballad subjects
 Mary Gray (socialist), British socialist activist and founder of the first Socialist Sunday School
 Mary L. Gray, American anthropologist and author
 Mary Augusta Dix Gray, American missionary to Nez Perce people in the Oregon Territory
Mary Gray, character in The American Venus

See also
 Mary Gray-Reeves (born 1962), bishop
 Mary Grey (disambiguation)